This is a list of awards and nominations received by Greek film and stage director, producer, and screenwriter Yorgos Lanthimos.

Major associations

Academy Awards

British Academy Film Awards

Golden Globe Awards

Cannes Film Festival

Venice Film Festival

Other awards and nominations

Belgian Film Critics Association

British Independent Film Awards

Critics' Choice Movie Awards

Dublin International Film Festival

European Film Awards

Evening Standard British Film Awards

Gotham Awards

Hellenic Film Academy Awards

Independent Spirit Awards

Lisbon & Estoril Film Festival

Los Angeles Film Critics Association

London Film Critics' Circle

Online Film Critics Society

Producers Guild of America

Sarajevo Film Festival

Sitges Film Festival

Stockholm International Film Festival

Sydney Film Festival

Thessaloniki International Film Festival

References

External links
 

Lanthimos, Yorgos
Lanthimos, Yorgos, list of awards and nominations received by